The Doppler parameter, or Doppler broadening parameter, usually denoted as , is a parameter commonly used in astrophysics to characterize the width of observed spectral lines of astronomical objects. It is defined as
,
where  is the one-dimensional velocity dispersion . Given this parameter, the velocity distribution of the line-emitting/absorbing atoms and ions proximated by a Gaussian can be rewritten as
,
where  is the probability of the velocity along the line of sight being in the interval .

The line width is also often specified in terms of the FWHM (full width at half maximum), which is 
.

Distribution 
The Doppler parameters of Lyman-alpha forest absorption lines are in the range 10–100 km s−1, with a median value around  that decrease with redshift .

See also 
 Doppler broadening
 Doppler spectroscopy

References 

 

 

 

 

Doppler effects
Astronomical spectroscopy